Tillandsia guerreroensis is a species of flowering plant in the genus Tillandsia. This species is endemic to Mexico.

References

guerreroensis
Endemic flora of Mexico
Plants described in 1987